Ben Lindsey may refer to:

Ben B. Lindsey (1869–1943), American judge and social reformer
Ben Lindsey (basketball) (born 1939 or 1940), American collegiate coach

See also
Ben Lindsay, British runner (2007 European Cross Country Championships#Junior men teams)
Ben Lindsay, Australian swimming medalist (2012 Australian Swimming Championships#Men's events 4×100 m medley relay)